The 2000–01 Interliga season was the second season of the multi-national ice hockey league. Nine teams participated in the league, and Olimpija from Slovenia have won the championship.

Regular season

Play-offs

Semi-finals

Final

Placing round

Ferencvárosi TC (7) – Medveščak (6): 3–3 (1–1, 2–0, 0–2)
Medveščak – Ferencvárosi: 7–5 (3–0, 1–2, 3–3)
Red Star (8) – Slavija (5): 0–5
Slavija – Red Star: 5–0
 
3rd place
Jesenice (4) – Dunaújvárosi Acélbikák (2): 5–3 (3–0, 1–2, 1–1)
Dunaújvárosi Acélbikák – Jesenice: 3–5 (1–1, 0–1, 2–3)

5th place
Slavija(5) – Medveščak (6): 3–3 (1–1, 0–2, 2–0)
Medveščak – Slavija: 3–4 n.P. (1–0, 0–3, 2–0, 0–1)

7th place
Red Star (8) – Ferencvárosi (7): 5–0
Ferencvárosi – Red Star: 0–5

Final ranking
Olimpija
Alba Volán Székesfehérvár
Jesenice
Dunaújvárosi Acélbikák
Slavija
Medveščak
Ferencvárosi
Red Star
Bled

External links
Season on www.hockeyarchives.info

Interliga (1999–2007) seasons
Interliga
2000–01 in European ice hockey leagues
Inter